
Lago di Chironico (or simply Laghetto) is an Alpine lake located above Chironico, in the Swiss canton Ticino. The lake lies at a height of 1,763 metres.

See also
List of mountain lakes of Switzerland

References

External links
Lago di Chironico (Italian)
Chironico